The 1942 Wilmington Clippers season was their sixth season in existence. Due to World War II, the 1942 American Association season was cancelled. So the Wilmington Clippers became Independent and posted a 8-0-1 record. Their head coach was George Veneroso. They ended the season with a 21–21 tie against the Philadelphia Eagles with 8,500 in attendance.

Schedule 
The table below was compiled using the information from The Pro Football Archives. The winning teams score is listed first. If a cell is greyed out and has "N/A", then that means there is an unknown figure for that game. Green-colored rows indicate a win; yellow-colored rows indicate a tie; and red-colored rows indicate a loss.

References 

Wilmington Clippers
Wilmington Clippers
Wilmington Clippers seasons